Herre's moray (Gymnothorax herrei) is a moray eel found in the western Pacific and Indian Oceans. It was first named by Beebe and Tee-Van in 1933.

References

herrei
Fish described in 1933
Taxa named by William Beebe
Taxa named by John Tee-Van